Grevillea linearifolia, commonly known as linear-leaf grevillea, is a species of flowering plant in the family Proteaceae and is endemic to New South Wales. It is an open, erect shrub with linear to narrowly elliptic leaves, and clusters of white flowers.

Description

Taxonomy
This species was first formally described in 1798 by Cavanilles, who gave it the name Embothrium linearifolium in his Icones et Descriptiones Plantarum from specimens collected near Port Jackson. In George Druce changed the name to Grevillea linearifolia in the supplement to The Botanical Exchange Club and Society of the British Isles Report for 1916. The specific epithet (linearifolia) means "linear-leaved".

The taxonomic limits of G. linearifolia are difficult to establish. In addition to variations between populations, the species is said to form "an intergrading complex" with G. parviflora, and may intergrade with G. patulifolia and/or G. humilis subsp. humilis. It is also known to hybridise often with G. sericea, and occasional hybrids with G. diffusa subsp. filipendula have also been reported.

Distribution and habitat
Linear-leaved grevillea grows in moist but well-drained soils, mostly sandy soils over sandstone amongst shrubby eucalypt woodland. It occurs mainly from Gosford and Putty, south to the Parramatta River and Port Jackson.  There are also some disjunct populations that differ slightly from the Gosford form, but have been placed provisionally in this species. These occur near Lawson in the lower Blue Mountains, just inland from Ulladulla, and near Nowra. Records of the species from Victoria are considered to be to a range of other species, specifically G. alpivaga, G. neurophylla, G. patulifolia, G. gariwerdensis and G. micrantha''.

References

linearifolia
Flora of New South Wales
Proteales of Australia
Plants described in 1798
Taxa named by Antonio José Cavanilles